The Trial of Joan of Arc is a 1962 French historical drama film written and directed by Robert Bresson. The title role is played by Florence Delay.

Synopsis
In 1431, Jeanne d'Arc, a peasant girl who has led the French troops against the English during the third phase of the Hundred Years' War, is imprisoned for heresy and brought to trial by an pro-English court in Rouen. From the trial's beginning, it is made clear by English representatives that the courts' verdict has to be Jeanne's execution by fire. Despite constant interrogations by the judges, Jeanne's faith in her mission, which she insists was assigned to her by God, remains unshaken. During the trial, she is not only questioned, but also tortured, her virginity examined, and molested. In a moment of weakness, Jeanne recants her faith, but later retracts her earlier confession. She is sentenced to death and burned at the stake.

Cast
 Florence Delay (credited as Florence Carrez) – Jeanne d'Arc
 Jean-Claude Fourneau – Bishop Cauchon
 Roger Honorat – Jean Beaupère
 Marc Jacquier – Jean Lemaître
 Jean Gillibert – Jean de Chatillon
 Michel Herubel – Frère Isambert de la Pierre
 André Régnier – D'Estivet
 André Brunet – Jean Massieu
 Marcel Darbaud – Nicolas de Houppeville
 Philippe Dreux – Frère Martin Ladvenu
 Paul-Robert Mimet – Guillaume Erard
 Richard Pratt – Warwick
 Gérard Zingg – Jean Lohier
 André Maurice – Tiphaine
 Harry Sommers – Bishop of Winchester

Production
As with all of Bresson's films after 1945, The Trial of Joan of Arc stars non-professional actors. In his version of the historical events, Bresson tried to "avoid 'theater' and 'masquerade', but to arrive at a non-historical truth by using historical words." He spoke unfavourably of Carl Theodor Dreyer's 1928 film, which covered the same subject, calling the actors' performances "horrible buffoonery". The screenplay is drawn from the transcriptions of Joan's trial and rehabilitation.

Release
The Trial of Joan of Arc premiered in competition at the Cannes Film Festival in 1962. It was screened the following year at the first New York Film Festival and saw a limited New York theatrical release in 1965.

Reception
The Trial of Joan of Arc was not warmly received by critics on its original release and for a long time regarded a minor work in the director's oeuvre, including critic Susan Sontag, who otherwise spoke highly positive of Bresson's work. An exception was director Jean-Luc Godard, who ranked the film as number one on his list of Ten Best Films of 1963. On the occasion of the film's 1965 New York release, Bosley Crowther (The New York Times) commented that Florence Delay delivered her dialogue "without change of expression and in a muted monotone" and faulted the overall "lack of dramatic highs and lows".

Retrospective reviews have been more positive, titling it a "gripping courtroom drama" (Kevin Maher, The Times) which features Delay as "one of the director's most perfect 'models'" (Melissa Anderson, The Village Voice) and culminates in an "unforgettable final image" (Gilbert Adair, Time Out).

Awards
The film won the Special Jury Prize at the 1962 Cannes Film Festival.

References

External links
 

1962 films
Films directed by Robert Bresson
Films about Joan of Arc
French prison films
1960s French films
French historical drama films
Films set in the 15th century